Toronto Motorsports Park is a dragway and 3-kilometre roadcourse racing facility in Haldimand County, near the town of Cayuga, Ontario, Canada.

Toronto Motorsports Park held the IHRA ACDelco Canadian Nationals, which attracted hundreds of cars from around Canada and the U.S., until 2007.

See also
 List of auto racing tracks in Canada

References

External links
 Toronto Motorsports Park Official website
  Aerial Photo

Motorsport venues in Ontario
Drag racing venues in Canada
IHRA drag racing venues
Road racing venues in Canada
Buildings and structures in Haldimand County
Tourist attractions in Haldimand County
Sports venues completed in 1955
1955 establishments in Ontario